Ammaiyappanallor is a village in Kancheepuram District, Tamil Nadu, India near Uthiramerur. The population was 842 with 240 households as of 2001 Indian census.

References

Villages in Kanchipuram district